Minuscule 619 (in the Gregory-Aland numbering), α 57 (von Soden), is a Greek minuscule manuscript of the New Testament, on parchment. It is dated by a colophon to the 984. The manuscript has complex contents. Tischendorf labelled it by 148a and 184p.

Description 

The codex contains the text of the Acts of the Apostles, Pauline epistles on 342 parchment leaves (size ). The text is written in one column per page, 15 lines per page for the biblical text, 46 lines per page for a commentary.

The order of books: Acts of the Apostles, Catholic epistles, and Pauline epistles. Hebrews is placed after Epistle to Philemon.

Text 

The Greek text of the codex Aland did not place in any Category.

History 

The manuscript was written in A.D. 984, Indict 12, by Theophylact, priest and doctor of law. It once belonged to the Benedictine Library of St. Mary. It was examined by Bernard de Montfaucon.

Formerly it was labelled by 148a and 184p. In 1908 Gregory gave the number 619 to it.

The manuscript was added to the list of New Testament manuscripts by Johann Martin Augustin Scholz. Gregory saw the manuscript in 1886.

The manuscript currently is housed at the Laurentian Library (Conv. Supr. 191), at Florence.

See also 

 List of New Testament minuscules
 Biblical manuscript
 Textual criticism
 Minuscule 620

References

Further reading 

 Bernard de Montfaucon, Palaeographia graeca (1708), p. 282.
 Kirsopp Lake & Silva Lake, Dated Greek Minuscule Manuscripts to the Year 1200, Boston IV, 155.

Greek New Testament minuscules
10th-century biblical manuscripts